Jung Da-bin (born April 25, 2000) is a South Korean actress. She first gained recognition in 2003 as a commercial model for Baskin-Robbins and was widely dubbed as "Ice Cream Girl". In 2005, she made her acting debut through the television series Wonderful Life. Since then, she has appeared in several dramas including She Was Pretty (2015) and The Flower in Prison (2016). More recently, she has starred in Extracurricular (2020) as a main character.

Filmography

Film

Television series

Web series

Music video appearances

Awards and nominations

References

External links
 
Jung Da-bin at Huayi Brothers Entertainment 
 
 
 

2000 births
Living people
South Korean child actresses
South Korean television actresses
South Korean film actresses